Menard Correctional Center, known prior to 1970 as Southern Illinois Penitentiary, is an Illinois state prison located in the town of Chester in Randolph County, Illinois.  It houses maximum-security and high medium-security adult males. The average daily population as of 2007 is 3,410.

Menard Correctional Center opened in March 1878; it is the second oldest operating prison in Illinois, and, by a large margin, the state's largest prison.  Menard once housed death row; however, on January 10, 2003, the Condemned Unit closed when then Governor George Ryan granted clemency to all Illinois death row inmates. It is a part of the Illinois Department of Corrections.

Menard Correctional Center's average prisoner age is 34 years old. Each inmate's average annual cost totals as of fiscal year 2018 $27,364.

Current facility 

The grounds are composed of six housing units. The South Lowers Housing Unit and the South Uppers Housing Unit house inmates with moderate aggression levels and those who currently have job assignments (Though closed for repairs in October 2018). The North I Cell House contains the Step-Down Unit, and General Population. The North II Cell House contains inmates in disciplinary segregation, administrative detention, and the general population. The East Cell House is heavily monitored. Inmates assigned here are classified as either Level E, High, or Moderate escape risk. The West Cell House holds inmates that are either high or moderate escape risk and are classified as High Aggressive Inmates, as well as the Protective Custody Unit.

Within the grounds there is also the Inmate Dining Hall, Chapel, Health Care Unit, Receiving and Classification Unit, Education Building, Maintenance and telecommunications Departments, Menard Division of Illinois Correctional Industries, and Randolph Hall, which acts as Menard's training complex for prison employees.

Inmates who are illiterate attend school. Other inmates can enroll voluntarily.  Menard had courses for elementary schooling and several high school subjects.

The current industries at Menard include meat processing, knitting and sewing, manufacturing of floor care and cleaning products, waste removal, and recycling operations.

Menard, as of 2006, employs approximately 854 prisoners. It has a daily population of around 3,416 inmates. The racial breakdown is 62% black, 28% white, and 9% Hispanic. Of the inmates housed at Menard 51% of offenders are incarcerated for murder, 21% of inmates have life sentences, and 33% are serving more than 20 years. The average age of inmates at Menard is 34 years old.

Capital punishment
By 1931, Menard was one of three sites in which executions were carried out by electrocution in Illinois. Between 1928 and 1962, the electric chair was used 18 times here for those sentenced to death in the southern counties of the state. The state's other electrocutions were carried out at the Stateville Correctional Center in Crest Hill and at the Cook County Jail in Chicago.

Prior to the January 11, 2003, commutation of death row sentences, male death row inmates were housed in Menard, Pontiac, and Tamms correctional centers. After the commutations, only Pontiac continued to hold death row prisoners.

History

19th century
The first Illinois penitentiary was founded in Alton, the Alton Military Prison, in 1833.  Reformer Dorothea Dix visited the site and was sharply critical of the filthy conditions there in an 1847 address to the Illinois General Assembly.  She noted, among many other things, that Alton was the only prison in the U.S. where inmates were made to stand while eating meals.  In 1858, the Alton prison was replaced by the Joliet Correctional Center and closed.

Twenty years later the Southern Illinois Penitentiary opened, taking prisoners from the southern counties of the state.  It was established in 1878 overlooking the Mississippi River.  It accepted 200 prisoners the next year.  The original buildings were finished by 1889, consisting of the North and South Cell Houses and the Administration Building. A wall enclosed the 11½ acres of the prison grounds. The rear wall runs over the top of a hill that was one of the prison's rock quarries.

Menard also had a quarry outside the walls. All the original buildings were constructed by prison labor. The original North and South Cell Houses each contained 400 cells on four tiers. Inmates lived two to a cell. None of these cells had plumbing.  Buckets were used instead.

The exterior includes columns and an awning portraying skeleton keys and a scale of justice. The entranceway has two stone lions. Christie Thompson and Joe Shapiro of The Marshall Project wrote that the exterior "looks more like an ornate university building than a maximum-security facility.

20th century

In 1928, the prison suffered from massive overcrowding. Designed to hold 800 men, the institution had approximately 2,000. Thus, an additional five cages were built on each side of the cell house corridors. These cages, which housed two men each, had a center wall of steel with the top and sides consisting of iron bars.

Old buildings within the prison yard were also being used as dormitories, housing prisoners until around 1930 when a new cell house was built to combat the excessive inmate population. The new cell house contained 500 cells, each housing two inmates. All of these cells had plumbing. In 1928, the bathhouse was located in the basement of one of the old buildings. It contained 76 showers. By 1931, the baths were relocated to the basement of the commissary, containing 84 concrete showers. Throughout this time, inmates were given time to bathe once a week during the winter and twice a week in the summer.

In 1927, of the 484 inmates who arrived at the prison in 1927, 406 were white, and 78 were black. By 1928, there were 1974 inmates and 96 guards, a ratio of roughly 1 to 20.  By 1931, the inmate population had risen to 2,285 with four yard offices and 130 guards, or approximately one guard to every 17 inmates. Of the 2,285 inmates, 1,844 were white and 441 were black.

In 1928, Menard owned  of farmland outside the grounds. The farm included a dairy and a piggery that contributed to the prison diet. The root cellar was one of the largest and most intricately designed of any institutions at the time. All industries within the prison were housed in the old buildings that, by 1928, had been renovated to provide better working conditions. The major industries included clothing manufacture, a quarry, and the farm. The products were sold on the open market; however, no compensation was awarded to inmates.

Merit, rules, and regulations

Indeterminate sentencing
In 1897, Illinois adopted indeterminate sentencing. By 1931, eighty percent of the inmates were serving indeterminate sentences.

Merit system
In 1903, a "grade system" was adopted for inmates. This lasted until 1920, when the "progressive Merit System" was adopted. Using this system, "good time" could be awarded to or taken from inmates based on their behavior. In addition, inmates were divided into grades, A, B, C, D, and E, based on behavior. The disciplinary staff, consisting of the warden and his deputies, decided on promotions and demotions in grade levels. For example, men in grades A and B were allowed to write two letters a week. Those in C could only write once a week. D and E inmates could only write on special permission.

Rules and regulations
Silence was mandatory in the mess hall and in marching lines. Smoking was permitted in the cells and dormitories. The prison commissary, around 1930, allowed inmates to buy tobacco, candy, toilet articles, canned goods, and fruit. No limit was set on the purchases.

Punishments
Around 1930, punishment involved a loss of privileges. For more serious offenses the men are put in punishment cells, large cells located in a building to the rear of the deputies' offices. For some offenses men were cuffed to the bars during working hours. By 1931, this practice was discontinued.

Major incidents

In the 1970s, a significant increase in inmate population, not only at Menard but also around the country, may have been the cause of two incidents during the time. In May 1973, thirty-eight inmates took over the commissary and held a guard hostage for sixteen hours. In May 1974, sixty inmates held four guards hostage, this time demanding congregation rights in the prison yard and several changes in administrative procedures.

In March 1994, Menard was in the news when 24-year-old Michael Blucker took the state to court after contracting HIV when in the prison. Blucker stated that prison staff helped gang members rape him. Although the juries found the staff not to be liable, the case uncovered problems of sexual assault and gang activities within the prison.

There were two deaths of prisoners who were housed in solitary confinement with other prisoners inside their cells. Circa 2004, 28-year-old Corey Fox, who was serving a life sentence for murder, killed 22-year-old Joshua Daczewitz, a person from a Chicago suburb who was convicted of arson and robbery. On November 29, 2014, David Sesson killed Bernard Simmons; the two were also placed in a solitary confinement cell together.

Notable inmates

 Nathan Leuthold, missionary, was sentenced to 80 years in Peoria County for the murder of his wife, Denise.
 Hubert Geralds was sentenced to life for the murders of six prostitutes on Chicago's south side.
 Kenneth Allen was sentenced to death (commuted to life) for the murders of Chicago police officers William Bosak and Roger van Schaik.
 David Hendricks was sentenced to four consecutive life sentences for the 1983 murders of his wife and children. Released after a 1991 retrial showed his innocence.
 Richard Honeck was paroled after serving 64 years of a life sentence for murder—reputedly the longest sentence ever served that ended in the prisoner's release.
 Homer Van Meter was a bank robber and criminal associate of John Dillinger.
 John Wayne Gacy was a notorious serial killer. Sentenced to death for the rape and murder of 33 boys and young men.
 Robin Gecht is serving 120 years for the mutilation and rape of an 18-year-old prostitute in the Chicago area during the early 1980s.
 Chester Weger was sentenced to life after being convicted of murdering 3 women at Starved Rock State Park in Utica, Illinois. Granted parole in November 2019.
 James Degorski is serving a life sentence without parole for the deaths of seven people in the 1993 Brown's Chicken massacre in Palatine, Illinois.
 Robert Ben Rhoades, truck driver, is a serial killer, and rapist. Suspected of killing and raping 100+ women while on the road in the 1980s and early 1990s.
 Drew Peterson, former police sergeant, was sentenced to 38 years for the murder of his 3rd wife, Kathleen Savio.
 Jack McCullough was sentenced to life in prison in September 2012 for the December 3, 1957, murder of seven-year-old Maria Ridulph, fifty-five years after the murder, but this conviction was overturned on April 15, 2016, and he was subsequently released.
 Reginald Potts Jr. was sentenced to life in prison without the possibility of parole for the murder of 28-year-old Nailah Franklin in 2007. This story was profiled on Dateline NBC.
 Clint Massey, Chicago rapper better known by his stage name RondoNumbaNine, was sentenced to 39 years for the 2014 murder of delivery driver Javan Boyd.
 Courtney Ealy, Chicago rapper better known by his stage name Cdai, was sentenced to 38 years for the 2014 murder of Javan Boyd.
Fred Hampton was an American activist and revolutionary, chairman of the Illinois chapter of the Black Panther Party.
 Stuart Heaton was sentenced to life in prison for the 1991 murder of a teenage girl.
 Andre Crawford was a serial killer convicted of killing eleven women.
 Milton Johnson was a serial killer convicted of at least ten murders.
 Michael Alfonso triple homicide. Extradited from Mexico.
 Kevin Taylor was a serial killer convicted of killing four women.

In popular culture

In the 1993 movie The Fugitive, Dr. Richard Kimble (played by Harrison Ford) is sent to the prison at Menard to await execution, but escapes following a bus-train collision en route.

See also

References

External links
 Menard Correctional Center - Illinois Department of Corrections

Buildings and structures in Randolph County, Illinois
Capital punishment in Illinois
Prisons in Illinois
1878 establishments in Illinois